Lagerstrom or Lagerström is a surname. Notable people with the surname include:

Alexander Lagerström (born 1991), Swedish ice hockey player
Oscar Lagerstrom (1890–1974), American sound engineer
Paco Lagerstrom (1914–1989), American mathematician and engineer
Tony Lagerström (born 1988), Swedish ice hockey player
Victoria Lagerström (born 1972), Swedish singer and beauty pageant winner